Sicamous is a district municipality in British Columbia located adjacent to the Trans-Canada Highway at the Highway 97A junction, where Mara Lake empties into Shuswap Lake via a short narrows. Sicamous is a resort town about halfway between Calgary and Vancouver and is the eastern gateway to the Apple Country. With  of shoreline, it styles itself as the houseboat capital of Canada. It has a population of  2,613 according to a 2021 census.

Name origin
Sicamous is an adaptation of a Shuswap language word meaning "river circling mountains".

History
In the 1800s, Sicamous and area was inhabited by a semi-nomadic Indigenous nation called the Secwepemc or Shuswap. They crossed the Rocky Mountains to hunt buffalo on the plains. In this area they were called the "Schickamoos". In 1872, a Provincial Map shows Schickamoos Narrows, which in early history was known as a "meeting place of Indians".

In 1864, gold was discovered on the Columbia River. Seymour Arm became a supply centre in the Big Bend Gold Rush.

In 1885, permanent settlers arrived after the driving of the Last Spike at Craigellachie, which linked Canada sea to sea. Among the first settlers in Sicamous were the families from Finland. Old Town, or Eagle Pass Landing as it is now known, became an almost instant town in 1871. It was the central supply centre for railway construction. Today it is used primarily for recreational purposes such as sledding, houseboating, hiking, swimming, and biking.

Later, in the early 1900s, CPR hill became a residential development. Finlayson's store and a jail were built in 1892, adding a post office in 1904. The first school opened around 1908. In 1949 a bridge was built across the channel, previously having been just a ferry crossing. Several hotels opened. In 1890 the original Sicamous Hotel was built by the Canadian Pacific Railway. It was operated for 8 years when in May 1898 it caught fire and burned down along with the station. In 1900 the hotel was rebuilt. The hotel was Tudor style with 75 rooms and a large elegant dining room. The dances were locally popular and well attended. In 1956 the railway ended service to the hotel and it closed. The hotel was demolished in 1964.

Eagle Valley, in Sicamous, became the home of many settlers. They came and farmed the land, putting up with forests, deep snow, and hordes of mosquitoes. The first newspaper in Sicamous was the Eagle Valley News. It was printed for the first time on 22 October 1958; it continues today.

On January 29, 1983 the Sicamous and District Recreation Centre had its Grand Opening. The arena was built with much volunteer help and local contractors that contributed supplies. Located in the M. J. Finlayson Centennial Park the Recreation Centre has become a vibrant and essential part of Sicamous. Many civic projects followed including a skateboard park built behind the arena. 

Unofficially formed in 1885, Sicamous became British Columbia's 148th municipality to be incorporated on Monday, December 4, 1989 when Letters Patent were presented to Mayor-elect Gordon Mackie by Municipal Affairs Minister Lyall Hanson. Mr. Mackie served as Mayor of the District of Sicamous for 10 years.

In June 2012, the community experienced major flooding due to heavy rains and an abnormally high amount of snow melt from higher elevations nearby.  Over 350 residents were evacuated, and many homes were heavily damaged.

Demographics 

Religion 
According to the 2021 census, religious groups in Sicamous included:
Irreligion (1,605 persons or 61.0%)
Christianity (995 persons or 37.8%)
Catholic (190 persons or 7.2%)
Anglican (140 persons or 5.3%)
United Church (135 persons or 5.1%)
Lutheran (55 persons or 2.1%)
Baptist (50 persons or 1.9%)
Pentecostal (50 persons or 1.9%)
Other Christian (375 persons or 14.3%)
Other (10 persons or 0.4%)

Gallery

Notable natives
Kristopher "Kris" Beech, professional ice hockey player
Colin Fraser, professional ice hockey player
Andrew Kozek, professional ice hockey player
Carolyn Mark, singer-songwriter
Shea Weber, professional ice hockey player
Cody Franson, professional ice hockey player
Rob Flockhart, professional ice hockey player, retired

References

External links

Populated places in the Columbia-Shuswap Regional District
District municipalities in British Columbia
Shuswap Country